The Sphere: An Illustrated Newspaper for the Home and, later, The Sphere: The Empire's Illustrated Weekly, was a British newspaper, published by London Illustrated Newspapers weekly from 27 January 1900 until the closure of the paper on 27 June 1964.

Background
The first issue came out at the height of the Boer War and was a product of that conflict and the public appetite for images. At the time, it was in direct competition with The Graphic and Illustrated London News, and evidence of this rivalry can be seen in the latter's publication shortly after of a new illustrated paper entitled The Spear in an attempt to confuse readers. During World War I, the weekly issues were called 'war numbers' and over two hundred appeared between 1914 and 1919. In all, it totalled 3,343 issues, plus a special supplement issued in January 1965, entitled Winston Churchill: A Memorial Tribute.

The Sphere was founded by Clement Shorter (1857–1926), who also founded Tatler in the following year. It covered general news stories from the UK and around the world; much of the overseas news features were reported in detail as the title was targeted at British citizens living in the colonies. It was similar to the Illustrated London News, another paper containing many graphic illustrations. 

Those featured in The Sphere were by renowned artists including W. G. Whitaker and Montague Dawson. Other illustrators included Sidney Paget, Henry Matthew Brock, Fortunino Matania, Ernest Prater, Edmund Blampied, Victor Coverley-Price and Claude Grahame Muncaster (1903–1974); photographers included Christina Broom (1862–1939); and writers included Bryher, Eleanour Sinclair Rohde, and Michael Wolff, and Balkans war heroine Dr Caroline Matthews. Thomas Hardy's short story A Changed Man was first published in The Sphere, in two instalments in the 21 and 28 April 1900 editions. During World War I the newspaper was bought by the shipping magnate John Ellerman. The Sphere was very popular during World War II.

The British Library and the National Library of Scotland hold copies of the entire publication run of this newspaper. The Sphere is searchable on the British Newspaper Archive.

In popular culture
In the film Three Faces East (1930), set in England during WWI, Frances Hawtree (Constance Bennett) peruses a copy of The Sphere.

References

Sources
 Illustrated London News Picture Library website
 Information on the Illustrated London News Group
 Thomas Hardy's A Changed Man

External links

 Illustration of trench system from the Sphere magazine, Scran ID: 000-000-475-242-C, National Library of Scotland

Defunct newspapers published in the United Kingdom
Defunct weekly newspapers
Weekly newspapers published in the United Kingdom
Newspapers established in 1900
Publications disestablished in 1964
1900 establishments in the United Kingdom
1964 disestablishments in the United Kingdom